List of United States military bases in Illinois is a listing of current and former United States military bases located in the US State of Illinois.

Air Force
Carmi Air Force Station, Carmi, Illinois (closed in 1957; now site of Carmi Municipal Airport)
Chanute Air Force Base, Rantoul, Illinois (closed in 1993)
Hanna City Air Force Station, Hanna City, Illinois (closed in 1968; now site of an FAA Long Range Radar)
Scott Air Force Base, Shiloh, Illinois

Army
Camp Butler, Springfield, Illinois
Camp Ellis, Bernadotte, Illinois
Camp Pine, Des Plaines, Illinois
Camp Skokie Valley, Glenview, Illinois
Camp Thornton, Thornton, Illinois
Charles Melvin Price Support Center, Granite City, Illinois (Closed circa 2000)
Fort Dearborn, Chicago
Fort Defiance, Cairo, Illinois
Fort Massac, Metropolis, Illinois
Fort Sheridan, Highwood, Illinois (closed 1993)
Fort Arlington, Arlington Heights, Illinois
Green River Ordnance Plant
Haley Army Airfield
Joliet Army Ammunition Plant, Joliet, Illinois
Rock Island Arsenal, Rock Island, Illinois
Savanna Army Depot, Savanna, Illinois (Closed circa 2000)

Nike
Project Nike, 20 plus sites, near Chicago and Metro-East.

Navy
Arlington Naval Outer Landing Field, Arlington Heights, Illinois
Libertyville Naval Outer Landing Field, Libertyville, Illinois
Naval Station Great Lakes, North Chicago, Illinois
Naval Air Station Glenview, Glenview, Illinois (Closed)

See also
List of United States military bases
List of United States Army installations
List of United States Navy installations
List of United States Air Force installations
List of United States Marine Corps installations

Bases
Military bases